Lucas Heinzen Coelho (born 20 July 1994) is a Brazilian professional footballer who plays as a forward for Boa Esporte.

Career statistics

References

External links
 Lucas Coelho profile. Portal Oficial do Grêmio.
 
 Lucas Coelho profile. Goal.
 Lucas Coelho at ZeroZero

1994 births
Living people
People from Lages
Brazilian footballers
Association football forwards
Campeonato Brasileiro Série A players
Campeonato Brasileiro Série B players
Grêmio Foot-Ball Porto Alegrense players
Goiás Esporte Clube players
Avaí FC players
ABC Futebol Clube players
Criciúma Esporte Clube players
Cianorte Futebol Clube players
Esporte Clube Cruzeiro players
Sportspeople from Santa Catarina (state)